Agrotis bryani is a moth of the family Noctuidae. It was first described by Otto Herman Swezey in 1926. It is endemic to the Hawaiian island of Nihoa.

External links

Agrotis
Endemic moths of Hawaii
Moths described in 1926